is a former Japanese football player.

Playing career
Murata was born in Aichi Prefecture on February 7, 1976. After graduating from Chukyo University, he joined Japan Football League club Oita Trinity (later Oita Trinita) in 1998. He played many matches from first season and the club was promoted to new league J2 League from 1999. However he could hardly play in the match in 1999. In 2000, he moved to newly was promoted to J2 club, Mito HollyHock. He played as regular player in 2000. In 2001, he moved to Prefectural Leagues club Gunma FC Horikoshi. The club was promoted to Regional Leagues from 2002. In 2003, he moved to Regional Leagues club Okinawa Kariyushi FC and played in 2 seasons. In 2005, he moved to Japan Football League club Denso. He retired end of 2005 season.

Club statistics

References

External links

1976 births
Living people
Chukyo University alumni
Association football people from Aichi Prefecture
Japanese footballers
J2 League players
Japan Football League (1992–1998) players
Japan Football League players
Oita Trinita players
Mito HollyHock players
Arte Takasaki players
FC Kariya players
Association football midfielders